The Alps are a major European mountain range.

Alps may also refer to:

Places

Europe

Subdivisions of the Alps proper 
Bavarian Alps, in Germany
Eastern Alps, in Austria, Switzerland, Germany, Italy, Slovenia and Liechtenstein
Julian Alps, in Italy and Slovenia
Northern Limestone Alps, in Austria and Germany
Southern Limestone Alps, in Italy, Austria and Slovenia
Southern Alps (Europe), in Italy, Austria and Slovenia
Western Alps, in France, Italy, Switzerland and Monaco

Other European mountain ranges 
Apuan Alps, in Italy
Arrochar Alps, in Scotland
Dinaric Alps, in Slovenia, Croatia, Bosnia and Herzegovina, Serbia, Montenegro, and Albania
Lyngen Alps, in mostly Norway
Sunnm%C3%B8rsalpane, in Norway
Transylvanian Alps, mostly in Romania

The Americas

United States
Alps, Georgia, in the State of Georgia
Bohemian Alps, in Nebraska
Issaquah Alps, in the State of Washington
Trinity Alps, in California

Greenland 
Nansen-Jensen Alps, North Greenland
Norlund Alps, in Hudson Land, NE Greenland
Princess Caroline-Mathilde Alps, in Holm Land, NE Greenland
Princess Elizabeth Alps, in Crown Prince Christian Land, NE Greenland
Schweizerland Alps, in King Christian IX Land, SE Greenland
Stauning Alps, in Scoresby Land, Greenland

Asia 
Japanese Alps, in Japan
Pontic Alps, in Turkey
Yeongnam Alps, in South Korea

Other continents and islands 
Australian Alps, in Australia in New South Wales, Victoria, and the ACT
Southern Alps (New Zealand), on the South Island of New Zealand

Solar System 
Montes Alpes, on the Moon

Other uses
Alps (film), a 2011 Greek drama
Alps Electric, a multinational corporation based in Japan
The Alps (film), a 2007 American documentary film
The Alps (band), an English band
Autoimmune lymphoproliferative syndrome, a form of lymphoproliferative disorder

See also
ALPS (disambiguation)
Alpes (disambiguation)
Alp (disambiguation)
ALP (disambiguation)
Alpine (disambiguation)